Ethiopian horses are those breeds or types of horse found in Ethiopia, formerly known as Abyssinia. There are about 2.8 million horses in Ethiopia, more than half the total in the African continent. Ethiopia reports only the Abyssinian breed to DAD-IS. In 2012 the horses of Ethiopia were characterised into eight distinct breeds or types with different regional distributions, including a gravely-endangered feral population, the Kundudo horse.

History 

Horses from Ethiopia, formerly known as Abyssinia, were in the past described as a single type, the "Abyssinian Horse" or "Ethiopian Horse", of variable size, colour and conformation. In 1997 two distinct types, the Oromo and Dongola, were described. Morphological research published in 2012 characterised eight distinct breeds or types with different regional distributions.

In 2007 no population data was available to the FAO, and no assessment of conservation status was made.

Characteristics 

Eight distinct breeds or regional types of horse are found in Ethiopia.

Abyssinian 

The Abyssinian type or breed is found mostly in the northern part of Ethiopia, particularly in the Semien Mountains in the area of Gondar, in the Amhara Region. It is poorly conformed, sway-backed and heavy in the belly. It is much used in agricultural work.

Bale 

The Bale breed or type has poor conformation, with a heavy belly and sway back. It is found in highland areas of the Bale Zone of the Oromia Region, in the southern part of the country.

Borana 

The Borana is a lowland breed kept by the pastoral Borana Oromo people, particularly in the area of the city of Megga in southern Ethiopia. It is of good conformation, is always bay, and is not used for draught work.

Horro 

The Horro or Horo breed is a poorly-conformed agricultural horse from the Horo area of western Oromia Region, in the west of Ethiopia.

Kafa 

The Kafa is a well-conformed and robust breed from the rain-forests of Sheka and Keffa zones of the Southern Nations, Nationalities and Peoples' Region.

Kundudo 

The Kundudo is a gravely-endangered population of feral horses, of unknown origin, from the area of the Kundudo plateau near the city of Harar, in the Misraq Hararghe zone of Oromia.

Ogaden 

The Somali, Ogaden or Wilwal is a well-conformed breed from the Somali Region of Ethiopia (the traditional Ogaden), and is concentrated in the area of the city of Jijiga.

Selale 

The Selale or Oromo is a good breed of riding horse from the Selale or Shewa areas of central Ethiopia.

Use 

Ethiopia is one of the poorest countries in the world. About three-quarters of all farms are more than one and a half days' walk from an all-weather road. Horses, mules and donkeys are essential to transport and horses are extensively used for transport, traction and agricultural work such as ploughing. Some breeds, in some areas, are used mainly for riding.

References

 

Horse breeds
Horse breeds originating in Ethiopia